Robert Angus McFarlane (17 January 1887 – June 1955) was a Scottish professional footballer who played as an inside left in the Scottish League for Queen's Park, Partick Thistle, Arbroath and Dundee United.

Personal life 
Before the First World War, McFarlane worked as a marine engineer in the Glasgow shipyards on the Clyde. As a member of the Royal Naval Volunteer Reserve, he joined the Royal Navy during the war. After the war, McFarlane studied engineering at the Royal Technical College and later went into business in Arbroath. After selling the business, he moved to Bearsden and became District Superintendent with the local council. McFarlane served with the Auxiliary Fire Service during the Second World War and was involved during the Clydebank Blitz.

Honours 
Arbroath
 Forfarshire Cup: 1923–24

Career statistics

References

1887 births
Scottish footballers
Scottish Football League players
Association football inside forwards
Queen's Park F.C. players
1955 deaths
Place of death missing
Footballers from Glasgow
Royal Naval Volunteer Reserve personnel of World War I
Parkhead F.C. players
Partick Thistle F.C. players
Arbroath F.C. players
Dundee United F.C. players
Scotland youth international footballers
British marine engineers
People from Maryhill
Scottish Junior Football Association players
Scotland junior international footballers
Civil Defence Service personnel